Frank Andrew Fuller (August 8, 1929December 14, 1993) was an American football defensive tackle who played nine seasons in the National Football League with the Los Angeles Rams, the Chicago/St. Louis Cardinals, and the Philadelphia Eagles.  He played college football at the University of Kentucky.

1929 births
1993 deaths
American football defensive linemen
Chicago Cardinals players
Eastern Conference Pro Bowl players
Kentucky Wildcats football players
Los Angeles Rams players
People from DuBois, Pennsylvania
Philadelphia Eagles players
Players of American football from Pennsylvania
St. Louis Cardinals (football) players